Group C of the 1996 Fed Cup Europe/Africa Zone Group I was one of four pools in the Europe/Africa Zone Group I of the 1996 Fed Cup. Four teams competed in a round robin competition, with the top two teams advancing to the knockout stage and the bottom team being relegated down to Group II for 1996.

Switzerland vs. Yugoslavia

Croatia vs. Georgia

Switzerland vs. Georgia

Croatia vs. Yugoslavia

Switzerland vs. Croatia

Georgia vs. Yugoslavia

  placed last in the pool, and thus was relegated to Group II in 1997, where they placed first in their pool of six, and thus advanced back to Group I for 1998.

See also
Fed Cup structure

References

External links
 Fed Cup website

1996 Fed Cup Europe/Africa Zone